Tajbeg Palace (Palace of the Large Crown), also inaccurately called the Queen's Palace, is one of the palaces in the popular Darulaman area of Kabul, Afghanistan. The stately mansion is located about 10 miles (16 km) south-west from the city's center. It sits on top of a knoll among foothills where the Afghan royal family once hunted and picnicked.

Originally built in the 1920s to house the Afghan royal family, Tajbeg Palace is one of the most impressive landmarks of "Darulaman," newly created during the era of Amanullah Khan by a team of European architects in an attempt to modernize Afghanistan. The palace was damaged during the civil war in the 1990s but was fully renovated in 2021.

History

Not far from the castle  or Tapa-e Taj Beg (Taj Beg hill), a palace for the Queen of the Timurids is said to have been found a long time ago. Terraced garden designs were preferred by Timurids and Moguls, and today some ruins remain. The Timurids and their successors, the Moguls, have kinship relations with the Pashtun tribes of Abdali Durrani and later Yusufzai. The daughter-in-law of Ahmad Khan Abdali (the wife of Timur Shah Durrani) was the daughter of Alamgir II.

According to some historians, the palace seems to have been renovated by Zaman Shah Durrani in 1795 (1210 AH), which was subsequently destroyed in military conflicts, and the ruins from ancient times remain. Foreign soldiers of ISAF have documented ruins of the former castle.

The new palace was constructed in the 1920s to house the Afghan royal family. The Swedish memoir writer Aurora Nilsson (also known as Rora Asim Khan), who lived in Afghanistan with her Afghan husband in 1926–27, describe in her memoirs how she was invited to the palace by Queen Soraya to describe Western lifestyle and customs to the Queen and the King's mother

On December 27, 1979, the Soviet Union launched its intervention in Afghanistan. That evening, the Soviet military launched Operation Storm-333, in which some 700 troops, including 54 KGB spetsnaz special forces troops from the Alpha Group and Zenith Group, stormed the Palace and killed PDPA general secretary Hafizullah Amin, who had resided there since December 20.

During the Soviet–Afghan War it served as the headquarters of the Soviet 40th Army. The palace was severely damaged in the years after the Soviet withdrawal from Afghanistan, when different Afghan mujahideen factions fought for control of Kabul after the fall of PDPA leader Mohammad Najibullah's Moscow-backed government in 1992.

The Afghan government, in conjunction with the German government, have drafted plans for renovating the palace for official use, requiring funds from private donations from wealthy Afghans. These plans were on indefinite hold as the Afghan government seeks to establish peace and stability. A similar plan was approved for the nearby Darul Aman Palace which was completely renovated and opened to the public on Afghan Independence Day, August 2019.

In 2021, the palace had been completely rebuilt.

Gallery

See also
 Beg (title)
 Taj Mahal
 Darul Aman Palace
Bagh-e Bala Palace

References

External links

www.Darulaman.de – (At the moment only in German – English will follow.)
Qasr-e Taj Beg

Palaces in Afghanistan
Buildings and structures in Kabul Province
Houses completed in the 20th century
Royal residences in Afghanistan
Ruined palaces
1920s establishments in Afghanistan